Phuket International Airport  is an international airport serving the Phuket Province of Thailand. It is in the north of Phuket Island,  from the centre of Phuket City. The airport plays a major role in Thailand's tourism industry, as Phuket Island is a popular resort destination. It is the third-busiest airport in Thailand in terms of passengers, after Suvarnabhumi Airport and Don Mueang International Airport in the Bangkok Metropolitan Region. The airport set a record 15.1 million arrivals and departures in 2016, up 17.8 percent from 2015.

Facilities

Terminals

The airport has three terminals: Terminal 2 is used for international flights, and Terminal 3 for domestic flights. Terminal X for charter flights opened in February 2014.

Phuket Airport underwent a 5.14-billion-baht expansion and renovation, with the work completed in 2016. The capacity of the new international terminal is 12.5 million passengers per year. The expansion increased airport capacity to 20 million passengers a year from its previous capacity of 6.5 million. A rail link from an alternate airport, Krabi, was suggested in 2012, as Phuket is congested with little room to expand.

Future

A new international airport, which will serve three provinces—Phang-Nga, Phuket and Krabi, is proposed. The airport will be built in two phases, out of which the first phase is expected to be completed by 2025. The airport will be able to cater more than 5 million passengers per year, and after the second phase, will cater to over 25 million passengers per year. It will serve as an alternative to Phuket and Krabi airports.

Airlines and destinations

Traffic statistics
Phuket is a favourite tourist destination in the region. International passengers mainly come from Asia Pacific and Europe. In 2012 it ranked second-busiest in total passenger traffic, after Suvarnabhumi Airport in the Bangkok metropolitan area. In mid-2015 the airport, designed to handle 20 flights per hour, was servicing 23 per hour.

Phuket airport handled 12.9 million passengers in 2015, 12.8 percent more than 2014, with international numbers rising 8.27 percent to 6.95 million and domestic up 18.6 percent to 5.9 million. Aircraft movements grew 11.6 percent to 84,758, with 43,996 international (up 7.63 percent) and 40,762 domestic (up 16.1 percent).

Passenger movements

Aircraft movements

Freight tonnage

Busiest international routes

Top destinations

Busiest domestic routes

Phuket Airport passenger totals (millions)

Incidents and accidents 
 On 15 April 1985 a Thai Airways Boeing 737-2P5 crashed, killing all 11 people on board. The crew had issued a radio call informing air traffic control that both engines had flamed out. No cause could be determined for the engine shutdown.
 On 31 August 1987 Thai Airways Flight 365 from Hat Yai International Airport crashed into the ocean upon final approach, killing all 83 people on board. The investigation determined pilot error as the primary cause.
 On 16 September 2007 One-Two-GO Airlines Flight 269 arriving on a scheduled flight from Bangkok's Don Mueang Airport crashed after hitting the runway while attempting to land in driving rain and severe wind shear. The McDonnell Douglas MD-82 slid off the runway, split into two, and exploded into flames after an apparent attempt to execute a go-around moments before touchdown. There were 123 passengers and seven crew on board. 89 died and 40 were injured.

References

External links

 Official website
 
 

Airports in Thailand
Buildings and structures in Phuket province